Coupar Angus Abbey was a Cistercian monastery near Coupar Angus, in central Scotland, on the boundary between Angus and Gowrie.

It was founded on the old royal manor of Coupar in 1161 x 1162 with the patronage of Máel Coluim IV ("Malcolm IV"), King of Scots, by Cistercian monks from Melrose Abbey. It became an abbey of medium to large size and wealth and enjoyed more than four centuries of monastic life. In 1559 the abbey was entrusted by Abbot Donald Campbell to his friend Katherine Campbell, Countess of Crawford.

The abbey was turned into a secular lordship for James Elphinstone, by parliament in 1606 and by royal charter in 1607. Today, there are almost no remains of the abbey, much of it being burned by the Protestant reformers. A collection of its charters has survived.  There are some remnants of a gatehouse, and some fine fragmentary stonework from the Abbey (notably a number of tombs) are preserved in the parish church, which stands on or near the site of the medieval building.  Other fragments are built into walls throughout the modern town.

The original layout of the abbey remains conjectural; a drawing of 1820 held in the National Library of Scotland allegedly showing the plan has been found to be incorrect.

In the 19th century women found the Ley tunnel of Coupar Angus Abbey near the entrance to the churchyard. One went in and was never seen again, however in 1982 a local mason found the entrance again and went in some distance before finding a cave-in. It is said that the tunnel ran a further two and a half miles to a souterrain at Pitcur.

Both the Abbey gatehouse and the Abbey precincts are separately designated as scheduled monuments.

See also
 Abbot of Coupar Angus, for a list of abbots and commendators

Notes

Bibliography
 Cowan, Ian B. & Easson, David E., Medieval Religious Houses: Scotland With an Appendix on the Houses in the Isle of Man, Second Edition, (London, 1976), pp. 73–4
 Easson, D.E., Charters of the Abbey of Coupar Angus, 2 vols., Publications of the Scottish History Society. 3rd series ; v. 40-41, (Edinburgh, 1947)
 Watt, D.E.R. & Shead, N.F. (eds.), The Heads of Religious Houses in Scotland from the 12th to the 16th Centuries, The Scottish Records Society, New Series, Volume 24, (Edinburgh, 2001), pp. 43–7

Buildings and structures in Perth and Kinross
Cistercian monasteries in Scotland
History of Perth and Kinross
Religion in Perth and Kinross
1162 establishments in Scotland
Religious organizations established in the 1160s
1606 disestablishments
Christian monasteries established in the 12th century
Scheduled Ancient Monuments in Perth and Kinross
Former Christian monasteries in Scotland
Coupar Angus